The Demon Apostle a 2000 fantasy novel by R. A. Salvatore. It is the third book in the first DemonWars Saga trilogy. The book is also the third out of seven books in the combined DemonWars Saga.

Plot summary
The final novel in the first trilogy begins with the mopping up of Bestesbulzibar's army and the battle against the demon's spirit, which has possessed the highest levels of power within the Abellican Church. Again, it is up to Elbryan and Pony, along with their friends, to combat the corruption and attempt to end its terrible hold forever.

References

American fantasy novels
Novels by R. A. Salvatore
2000 American novels
Del Rey books